Marcus Aemilius Lepidus may refer to:

 Marcus Aemilius Lepidus (consul 232 BC)
 Marcus Aemilius Lepidus (consul 187 BC), princeps senatus and pontifex maximus, he completed the via Aemilia and the basilica Aemilia.
 Marcus Aemilius Lepidus (consul 158 BC)
 Marcus Aemilius Lepidus (consul 126 BC)
 Marcus Aemilius Lepidus (consul 78 BC), he led a rebellion the year after his consulship, but failed and died in Sardinia.
 Marcus Aemilius Lepidus (triumvir), member of the Second Triumvirate together with Octavian and Mark Antony.
 Marcus Aemilius Lepidus Minor
 Marcus Aemilius Lepidus (consul 6)
 Marcus Aemilius Lepidus (executed by Caligula)